Carlo Ignazio Pozzi (1786–1842), was a German painter and architect. He was born in Mannheim, Holy Roman Empire, to a Swiss father, Francesco Pozzi (stuccoist). He studied at the Academy of his native city.

He traveled through the Netherlands, and then visited Parma. He painted historical scenes, portraits, and landscapes. In 1779 he was engaged in scene painting at Dessau.

References

1786 births
1842 deaths
19th-century German painters
German male painters
19th-century German male artists